Mo Jing or Mozi is the Mohist canon.

Mo Jing may also refer to:
 That Demon Within, a 2014 Hong Kong film by Dante Lam
 The Mirror (2015 film), Chinese-South Korean film